Conus bessei is a species of sea snail, a marine gastropod mollusk in the family Conidae, the cone snails and their allies.

Like all species within the genus Conus, these snails are predatory and venomous. They are capable of "stinging" humans, therefore live ones should be handled carefully or not at all.

Distribution
This species occurs in the Caribbean Sea off Honduras and Belize

Description 
The maximum recorded shell length is 15 mm.

Habitat 
Minimum recorded depth is 20 m. Maximum recorded depth is 20 m.

References

 Petuch, E. J. 1992. Molluscan discoveries from the tropical Western Atlantic region. Part 1. New species of Conus from the Bahamas Platform, Central American and northern South American coasts, and the Lesser Antilles. La Conchiglia 23(264): 36-40
 Puillandre N., Duda T.F., Meyer C., Olivera B.M. & Bouchet P. (2015). One, four or 100 genera? A new classification of the cone snails. Journal of Molluscan Studies. 81: 1–23

External links
 The Conus Biodiversity website
 

bessei
Gastropods described in 1992